Nectophrynoides tornieri, Tornier's forest toad or kijula, is a species of toad in the family Bufonidae. It is endemic to Tanzania. This species was first described by Jean Roux in 1906 and was named in honour of the German zoologist Gustav Tornier.

Description
Tornier's forest toad is sexually dimorphic and the colouring also varies considerably between individuals. The females measure  in length with the dorsal surface rust coloured with a central yellow region and a ventral surface that appears translucent. Females may also have two black bands across the lower legs and feet. The fingers on both sexes have expanded, flattened blunt pads.

Distribution and habitat
Tornier's forest toad is endemic to the Eastern Arc Mountains in southern and eastern Tanzania. It is a terrestrial species and clambers about in low vegetation, forages on the ground and hides under leaf litter.

Diet
Tornier's forest toad eats small invertebrates such as ants.

Mating and reproduction
Breeding takes place in the rainy season. Males advertise themselves to attract females by calling at night from low vegetation. While doing this they adopt a characteristic pose with all four limbs extended. Unlike most frogs, this species is viviparous. Internal fertilisation takes place and the eggs, which are 3-4 mm in diameter, develop directly into juvenile frogs in the oviduct of the female. Up to thirty-five offspring have been found developing in one female.

Status
Tornier's forest toad is listed as being of "Least Concern" in the IUCN Red List of Threatened Species. Although it occupies a total range that is smaller than  it is common in much of this area and is not thought to be in significant decline. It is an adaptable species and when logging has affected its traditional habitat, has moved into agricultural areas and banana plantations. It is also threatened by illegal gold mining.

References

tornieri
Amphibians described in 1906
Endemic fauna of Tanzania
Amphibians of Tanzania
Taxa named by Jean Roux
Taxonomy articles created by Polbot